Isku Areena is an arena in Lahti, Finland. It is primarily used for ice hockey, and is the home arena of Pelicans. It opened in 1973 and holds  5 530 people. It was renovated in 2010.

Indoor arenas in Finland
Indoor ice hockey venues in Finland
Sport in Lahti
Buildings and structures in Päijät-Häme